DKDA: Sueños de juventud (English: DKDA: Youth dreams) is a Mexican juvenile telenovela produced by Luis de Llano Macedo for Televisa in 1999.

On Monday, November 22, 1999, Canal de las Estrellas started broadcasting DKDA: Sueños de juventud weekdays at 7:00pm, replacing Alma rebelde. The last episode was broadcast on Friday, April 28, 2000 with Locura de amor replacing it the following day From Monday, August 7, 2000 to Tuesday November 28, 2000 Weeknights on Univisión

Jan and Litzy (who later is replaced by Andrea Torre) starred as protagonists, María Sorté, Otto Sirgo and Eugenia Cauduro starred as adult protagonists, while Nora Salinas, Luis Gatica, Alessandra Rosaldo and José Suárez starred as antagonists.

Cast 
 
María Sorté as Rita Martínez
Otto Sirgo as Eduardo Arias
Eugenia Cauduro as Angela Rey de Arias/Kara Giacometti
Nora Salinas as Leticia del Rosal
Luis Gatica as Raúl Arias
Jan as Rodrigo Arias
Litzy as Laura Martínez #1
Andrea Torre as Laura Martínez #2
Alessandra Rosaldo as Brenda Sakal
Patricio Borghetti as Axel Harris
Ernesto D'Alessio as Mateo D'Avila
Verónica Jaspeado as Camila Saldívar
Paola Cantú as Regina Salas
Sharis Cid as Karla Rincón
José Suárez as Paolo Martínez
Macaria as Prudencia Rincón
Luis Ernesto Cano as Tino Ventura
Orlando Miguel as Jerónimo Gutiérrez Rivera
Cecilia Toussaint as Lola Saldivar
Mauricio Barcelata as Andrés Sánchez
Riccardo Dalmacci as Néstor Giacometti
Archie Lanfranco as Iván
Lourdes Munguía as Luisa Insuaín
Luis Gimeno as Jorge Rey
Yessica Salazar as Christi Borgoña
Ilan Arditti as Patricio
Maki as Sandra
Michel Brown as David
Milton Cortez as Ramón
José Luis Cordero "Pocholo" as Librado
Marco Uriel as Fernando Insuaín
Esther Rinaldi as Sofía
Jacqueline Voltaire as Jackie
Amparo Arozamena as Carmelita
Arsenio Campos as Felipe
Sergio Sánchez as Sergio
Cecilia Gutiérrez as Perla
Olivia Robles as Chantal
Alfredo Adame as Plomero
Dulce María as Mary Cejitas
Mauricio Islas as himself/host
Ivonne Montero as herself
Adal Ramones as ''Himself
Innis as himself
Adolfo Angel as himself
Gustavo Angel as himself
Aitor Iturrioz as himself
Ramiro Torres as Host Mirim/Rodrigo Arias (child)
Fátima Torre as Karla Rincón (child)
Constanza Mier as Camila Saldivar (child)
Gisella Aboumrad as Bergoña Rodríguez
Alan Ledesma as Joaquin
Martha Cristiana as Hostess
Mónica Panini as Attendant at airport/Officer of justice
Marlene Favela as Gina
Niurka Marcos as Perla
Yuliana Peniche as Jessica

Soundtrack

Awards

References

External links

1999 telenovelas
Mexican telenovelas
1999 Mexican television series debuts
2000 Mexican television series endings
Spanish-language telenovelas
Television shows set in Mexico
Televisa telenovelas